The roc is an enormous legendary bird of prey in the popular mythology of the Middle East. 

The roc appears in Arab geographies and natural history, popularized in Arabian fairy tales and sailors' folklore. Ibn Battuta tells of a mountain hovering in the air over the China Seas, which was the roc. The story collection One Thousand and One Nights includes tales of Abd al-Rahman and Sinbad the Sailor, both of which include the roc.

Etymology
The English form roc originates via Antoine Galland's French from Arabic ruḵḵ and that from Persian ruḵ. In both languages, Arabic and Persian, the word is written in the Arabic script as رخ. Common romanizations are ruḵḵ for the Arabic form and ruḵ, rokh or rukh for the Persian form.

Eastern origins

According to art historian Rudolf Wittkower, the idea of the roc had its origins in the story of the fight between the Indian solar bird Garuda and the chthonic serpent Nāga. The mytheme of Garuda carrying off an elephant that was battling a crocodile appears in two Sanskrit epics, the Mahabharata (I.1353) and the Ramayana (III.39).

Western expansion 
 
Rabbi Benjamin of Tudela reported a story reminiscent of the roc in which shipwrecked sailors escaped from a desert island by wrapping themselves in ox-hides and letting griffins carry them off as if they were cattle. 

In the 13th century, Marco Polo (as quoted in Attenborough (1961: 32)) stated It was for all the world like an eagle, but one indeed of enormous size; so big in fact that its quills were twelve paces long and thick in proportion. And it is so strong that it will seize an elephant in its talons and carry him high into the air and drop him so that he is smashed to pieces; having so killed him, the bird swoops down on him and eats him at leisure.

Polo claimed that the roc flew to Madagascar "from the southern regions", and that the Great Khan sent messengers to the island who returned with a feather (likely a Raphia frond). He explicitly distinguishes the bird from a griffin.

In The Arabian Nights the roc appears on a tropical island during Sinbad's second voyage. Because of Polo's account, others identified the island as Madagascar, which became the location for stories about other giant birds. Doubtless, it was Polo's description that inspired Antonio Pigafetta, one of Ferdinand Magellan's companions, who wrote or had ghost-written an embroidered account of the circumglobal voyage: in Pigafetta's account the home grounds of the roc were the seas of China. Such descriptions captured the imaginations of later illustrators, such as Stradanus  1590 or Theodor de Bry in 1594 who showed an elephant being carried off in the roc's talons, or showed the roc destroying entire ships in revenge for destruction of its giant egg, as recounted in the fifth voyage of Sinbad the Sailor. Ulisse Aldrovandi's Ornithologia (1599) included a woodcut of a roc with a somewhat pig-like elephant in its talons, but in the rational world of the 17th century, the roc was regarded more critically. In the modern era, the roc, like many other mythological and folkloric creatures, has entered the bestiaries of some fantasy role-playing games such as Dungeons and Dragons.

Rationalized accounts
The scientific culture of the 19th century introduced some "scientific" rationalizations for the myth's origins, by suggesting that the origin of the myth of the roc might lie in embellishments of the often-witnessed power of the eagle that could carry away a newborn lamb. In 1863, Bianconi suggested the roc was a raptor (Hawkins and Goodman, 2003: 1031). Recently a giant subfossil eagle, the Malagasy crowned eagle, identified from Madagascar was actually implicated as a top bird predator of the island, whose megafauna once included giant lemurs and pygmy hippopotamuses.

Another possible origin of the myth is accounts of eggs of another extinct Malagasy bird, the enormous Aepyornis elephant bird, hunted to extinction by the 16th century, that was three meters tall and flightless. There were reported elephant bird sightings at least in folklore memory as Étienne de Flacourt wrote in 1658. Its egg, live or subfossilised, was known as early as 1420, when sailors to the Cape of Good Hope found eggs of the roc, according to a caption in the 1456 Fra Mauro map of the world, which says that the roc "carries away an elephant or any other great animal". Between 1830 and 1840 European travelers in Madagascar saw giant eggs and egg shells. English observers were more willing to believe their accounts because they knew of the moa in New Zealand. In 1851 the French Academy of Sciences received three eggs. They and later fossils seemingly confirmed to 19th-century Europeans that Aepyornis was the roc, but the real bird does not resemble an eagle as the roc is said to.

Another rationalizing theory is that the existence of rocs was postulated from the sight of the African ostrich, which, because of its flightlessness and unusual appearance, was mistaken for the chick of a presumably much larger species. On the other hand, a medieval Northern European or Indian traveller, if confronted with tales about ostriches, might very well not have recognized them for what they were (compare History of elephants in Europe).

In addition to Polo's account of the rukh in 1298, Chou Ch'ű-fei (周去非, Zhōu Qùfēi), in his 1178 book Lingwai Daida, told of a large island off Africa with birds large enough to use their quills as water reservoirs. Fronds of the raffia palm may have been brought to Kublai Khan under the guise of roc's feathers.

Some recent scholars have compared the legendary roc with the Haast's eagle, of New Zealand.  long with a  wingspan, it became extinct around the 15th century, but probably inspired the Māori legend of Te Hokioi or Te Hakawai. This was said to be a colorful huge bird which (in some versions of the legend) had occasionally descended to Earth to carry off humans to eat, but generally lived in the clouds unseen. Only its cry, after which it was named, could be heard. Indeed, the hokioi seems to be a composite mythical beast inspired by actual animals, just like the roc appears to have been. In the 1980s, it was found that male Coenocorypha snipes, tiny nocturnal waders, produce an unexpectedly loud roaring sound with their tails during mating flights. The supposed coloration of the hokioi is not matched by any known bird, and generally would be extremely unusual for a bird of prey. Thus, as it seems likely that the hokioi was the eerie "drumming" of the snipes, explained with the ancestor's tales about the giant eagles which they still knew from living memory.

Religious tradition

Michael Drayton
Through the 16th century the existence of the roc could be accepted by Europeans. In 1604, Michael Drayton envisaged the rocs being taken aboard the Ark:

All feathered things yet ever knowne to men,
From the huge Rucke, unto the little Wren;
From Forrest, Fields, from Rivers and from Pons,
All that have webs, or cloven-footed ones;
To the Grand Arke, together friendly came,
Whose severall species were too long to name.

Ethiopian
The rukh is also identified in the Ethiopian holy book Kebra Negast as the agent responsible for delivering the blessed piece of wood to Solomon which enabled the great king to complete Solomon's Temple. This piece of wood also is said to have transformed the Queen of Sheba's foot from that of a goat to that of a human.  The piece of wood that the rukh brought was therefore given an honored place in the Temple and decorated with silver rings.  According to tradition, these silver rings were given to Judas Iscariot as payment for betraying Jesus; the piece of wood became Jesus's cross.

See also 
 
 Eagle (Middle-earth), the giant birds of J. R. R. Tolkien's tales
 List of fictional birds of prey
 Mount Qaf, the only place in this world where the roc will land
 Shahrokh
 Sinbad the Sailor
 Scaled Composites Stratolaunch, currently the largest airplane by wingspan, which carries the nickname Roc
 Vogel Rok, A Rollercoaster themed to the myth in the Efteling
 Rocs appear in the 2000 novel Baudolino by Umberto Eco

Footnotes

References
For a collection of legends about the roc, see Edward Lane's Arabian Nights, chap; xx. notes 22, 62

 Bochart, Samuel, Hierozoicon,  vi.14
 Damfri, I. 414, ii. 177 seq.
  (1658). Histoire de la grande île de Madagascar. Paris. New edition 2007, with Allibert C. notes and presentation, Paris, Karthala ed. 712 pages
  (1994). "Description of a new species of subfossil eagle from Madagascar: Stephanoaetus (Aves: Falconiformes) from the deposits of Amphasambazimba," Proceedings of the Biological Society of Washington, 107: 421–428.
  (1988): The Hakawai. Notornis 35(3): 215–216. PDF fulltext
  (1987): The identity of the hakawai. Notornis 34(2): 95–116. PDF fulltext
  (2003) in : The Natural History of Madagascar: 1019–1044. University of Chicago Press.
 Ibn Batuta, iv. 305ff
 Kazwini, i. ~I9 seq.
  (2002). In search of the Red Slave: Shipwreck and Captivity in Madagascar. Sutton Publishing, Stroud, Gloucestershire.
 Spiegel, Friedrich, Eranische Alterthumskunde, ii. 118.
 Yule, Heny as above. 
Allibert C., Le monde austronésien et la civilisation du bambou: une plume qui pèse lourd: l'oiseau Rokh des auteurs arabes, in Taloha 11, Antananarivo, Institut de Civilisations, Musée d'Art et d'Archéologie, 1992: 167–181

Further reading
 Al-Rawi, Ahmed. "A Linguistic and Literary Examination of the Rukh Bird in Arab Culture." Al-'Arabiyya 50 (2017): 105–17. www.jstor.org/stable/26451398.

External links

Sir Richard F. Burton's notes on the Rukh

 
Legendary birds
Persian legendary creatures
Mythological birds of prey
Arabian legendary creatures